Ryan Wade is a former UNC and Team USA lacrosse player.  Ryan attended Severn High School in Annapolis, MD.  He then played college lacrosse at the University of North Carolina, winning the national championship in 1991.  He was two-time ACC player of the year and named first team All-American three years.  He played for Team USA on the 1994 and 1998 national teams and was named MVP of the 1998 team.  In 1995 he played for Western Australia which won a historic Australian National Championship defeating Victoria in Melbourne, Australia.

Wade was elected to the National Lacrosse Hall of Fame in 2013.

University of North Carolina

References 

North Carolina Tar Heels men's lacrosse players
Year of birth missing (living people)
Living people